INS Nistar was a submarine rescue vessel of the Indian Navy. 

It was bought from reserve stock of the USSR in 1969 and was commissioned by the Indian Navy in 1971. The ship having a displacement of 800 tonnes had the capability of rescuing the crew of a disabled submarine from deep depths, using a "rescue bell", by the dry escape method, which avoided problems associated with decompression. 

Nistar was used during Indo-Pakistani War of 1971 to locate Pakistan Navy submarine , which sank off the port of Vizag.

Nistar was decommissioned on 3 November 1989. Some of her equipment such as diving bell were later bequeathed to diving tender INS Nireekshak.

External links
 http://indiannavy.nic.in/book/diving-cadre-and-chariot-project

References

Auxiliary ships of the Indian Navy